Deshamanya Robin Bradman Weerakoon, CCS (born 20 October 1930) is a Sri Lankan civil servant. As a senior bureaucrat of the Sri Lankan government, he served nine Sri Lankan heads of state in a career spanning half a century.

Early life

His father, Edmund R. Weerakoon and his mother, a teacher at Princess of Wales College, were both devout Anglicans. He was born in Colombo, Sri Lanka on 20 October 1930 and named after the legendary Australian cricketer Don Bradman who sailed to Colombo on the day of his birth.

Education

He studied at Holy Cross College, Kalutara and later was one of the first boarding students at St. Thomas's College, Guruthalawa during the parent school at Mount Lavinia's breakup into three separate branch schools (at Kollupitiya, Gurutalawa and Bandarawela) during World War II. He obtained a Bachelor of Arts Degree with second class honors (upper division) in economics and sociology from University of Ceylon and was awarded a Fulbright scholarship to study in University of Michigan for one year where he did his MA in Sociology.

Civil service

Weerakoon joined the Ceylon Civil Service in 1954 and was assigned as a cadet to the Anuradhapura Kachcheri  as an understudy to the Government Agent (GA) of Anuradhapura, after which  he spent a year in Jaffna where he learnt Tamil. After that he was transferred to Badulla, but before he could assume duties, the order was withdrawn and he was sent to the Prime Minister's office.

In 1953, he was appointed as the assistant secretary to the prime minister at the time, Sir John Kotelawela. He later became the secretary to the prime minister and continued after Solomon Bandaranaike became the prime minister in 1956. After his death, he served Wijayananda Dahanayake and Sirimavo Bandaranaike. Thereafter he worked for Dudley Senanayake although some in the UNP felt uneasy about his presence. After Sirimavo won the election again in 1970, he was transferred as Government Agent of Batticaloa and later Ampara, since he was deemed untrustworthy having conveyed information to the UNP Dudley Senanayake during Mrs. Bandaranike's previous regime.

In 1976, he retired from his post to join International Planned Parenthood Federation (IPPF), an NGO working in the area of family planning as its Secretary General.

In 1977, J. R. Jayawardene appointed him as the Permanent Secretary to the Ministry of Plantation. In 1980, he joined the Prime Minister's office once again as secretary during the tenure of Prime Minister Ranasinghe Premadasa. Following the ethnic riots of 1983, he was appointed as Commissioner-General of essential services with wide-ranging administrative powers. In 1984, he rejoined IPPF as its secretary-general in London for one year, which entailed a great deal of travel from China to Africa to Mexico.

Following President Premadasa's assumption of office he was appointed presidential advisor on international affairs during a period when Indo-Lanka relations were at their lowest, following the expulsion of the IPKF.

After Premadasa's death, he continued as the advisor of his successor Wijetunge, and resigned in 1994 when Chandrika Kumaratunga became the president.

After Ranil Wickremesinghe became the prime minister in 2001, Weerakoon was reappointed to his previous position of Secretary to the prime minister. He was an influential figure in Wickremesinghe's administration, especially in the peace process between the government and the Tamil Tigers.

His memoir Rendering Unto Caesar was published in 2004 after Wickremesinghe's government was defeated.

Family

Weerakoon married Damayanthi Gunasekara (d. June 2007). They have one child, Esala, who also became a senior civil servant. Married to Krishanti, the daughter of another well known Sri Lankan civil servant Bernard Tilakaratna, Esala Weerakoon was a former Sri Lankan ambassador to Norway who declined to co-operate in a publicity campaign against the Tamil Tigers, former Deputy Chief of Mission at the  Sri Lanka Embassy in Washington, USA and current Sri Lankan High Commissioner to India.

References

External links

Bradman Weerakoon: Biographical sketch at bradmanweerakoon.com
Interview by Sanjana Haththotuwa at groundviews.org, 1 December 2010 
Sri Kantha, Sachi Rendering Unto Caesar: Memoirs of a Sinhalese Bureaucrat (Pro-Tamil) review at Sangam.org, 19 December 2004

1930 births
Living people
Sri Lankan Buddhists
Alumni of Holy Cross College, Kalutara
Alumni of S. Thomas' College, Gurutalawa
Alumni of the University of Ceylon
University of Michigan alumni
Sinhalese civil servants
Deshamanya